Leahy is a Canadian folk rock band.

Leahy may also refer to:

 Leahy (surname), people with the surname Leahy
 USS Leahy (DLG-16), a US Navy destroyer leader
 Leahy class cruiser, a class of US guided missile cruisers
 Leahy Law, governing US military assistance to foreign military units
 Cape Leahy, in Antarctica
 Leahy (album)

See also 
 Leahey, a surname
 Leakey (disambiguation)